Ella Vanhanen (born 15 September 1993) is a Finnish football striker. She plays for Åland United of the Naisten Liiga.

Club career
She played for KMF before joining Pallokissat. In February 2013 Vanhanen signed a National Letter of Intent to join the University of Pittsburgh, where she will play varsity soccer for the Pittsburgh Panthers.

International career
She was called up to be part of the national team for the UEFA Women's Euro 2013.

Honours

Club
Pallokissat
Runner-up
 Finnish Women's Cup: 2012

References

External links
 
 Profile at fussballtransfers.com
 
 Profile at soccerdonna.de

1993 births
Living people
Finnish women's footballers
Finland women's international footballers
People from Kuopio
Pittsburgh Panthers women's soccer players
Finnish expatriate footballers
Finnish expatriate sportspeople in the United States
Expatriate women's soccer players in the United States
Kansallinen Liiga players
Pallokissat players
Åland United players
Women's association football forwards
Sportspeople from North Savo